Svatoš (Czech and Slovak feminine: Svatošová) is a surname. Notable people with this surname include:

 Adam Svatoš (born 1979), Czech musician
 Jan Svatoš (1910–unknown), Czech cross-country skier
 Marek Svatoš (1982–2016), Slovak ice hockey player

See also
 Swatosch
 

Czech-language surnames
Slovak-language surnames